Animuccia is an Italian surname. Notable people with the surname include:

 Giovanni Animuccia (1520–1571), Italian composer
 Paolo Animuccia (died 1569), Italian composer, brother of Giovanni

Italian-language surnames